Saucon Creek is a  tributary of the Lehigh River in  Lehigh and Northampton counties, Pennsylvania, in the United States.

Saucon Creek starts in Lower Milford Township, flows to the northeast passing through the communities of Limeport, Bingen, and Hellertown, and joins the Lehigh River in Bethlehem. The Meadows Banquet Center in Hellertown and Saucon Park in Bethlehem are located along the Saucon. The Ehrhart's Mill Historic District is located along Saucon Creek.

See also
Nancy Run, next tributary of the Lehigh River going downriver
Monocacy Creek, next tributary of the Lehigh River going upriver
List of rivers of Pennsylvania

References

Tributaries of the Lehigh River
Rivers of Pennsylvania
Rivers of Lehigh County, Pennsylvania
Rivers of Northampton County, Pennsylvania